Events in the year 1825 in Art.

Works

Filippo Albacini – The Wounded Achilles (marble)
John Constable – Leaping Horse
Robert Dampier – Portrait of Princess Nahiennaena of Hawaii
John Doyle – Turning out the Stag
William Etty – The Combat: Woman Pleading for the Vanquished
John Martin – Mezzotint illustrations to the Paradise Lost of Milton (publication begins)
Samuel Morse – Portrait of Lafayette
Samuel Palmer – Landscape with Repose of the Holy Family
Martinus Rørbye – View from the Artist's Window
Bartholomeus van Hove – Pompenburg with Hofpoort in winter

Births
February 4 – Myles Birket Foster, English illustrator and watercolour painter (died 1899)
March 13 – Hans Gude, Norwegian painter (died 1903)
May 1 – Eleanor Vere Boyle, English watercolorist and illustrator (died 1916)
May 9 – James Collinson, English Pre-Raphaelite painter (died 1881)
July 6 – Randolph Rogers, American neoclassical sculptor (died 1892)
July 10 – Benjamin Paul Akers, American sculptor (died 1861)
August 12 – Vito D'Ancona, Italian painter (died 1884)
September 6 – Giovanni Fattori, Italian painter (died 1908)
September 13 – William Henry Rinehart, American sculptor (died 1874)
December 13 – Gerolamo Induno, Italian painter (died 1890)

Deaths
January 11 – Jacopo Tunicelli, Italian portrait miniature painter (born 1784)
February 24 – Toyokuni, Japanese master of ukiyo-e, especially Kabuki actor prints (born 1769)
March 8 – Adélaïde Dufrénoy, French poet and painter from Brittany (born 1765)
March 25 – Raphaelle Peale, American still-life painter (born 1774)
April 6 – Vladimir Borovikovsky, Ukrainian-born portrait painter (born 1757)
April 16  – Henry Fuseli, British painter and art critic (born 1741)
April 23 – Friedrich Müller, German painter, narrator, lyricist and dramatist (born 1749)
April 27 – Dominique Vivant, French artist, writer, diplomat, author and archaeologist (born 1747)
May 5 – François-Louis Gounod, French painter (born 1758)
June 1 – Giovanni Monti, Italian landscape painter (born 1765)
June 13 – Johann Peter Melchior, German porcelain modeller (born 1742)
June 14 – Pierre Charles L'Enfant, French architect and artist (born 1754)
June 22 – Domenico Vantini, Italian painter specializing in miniature portraits (born 1765)
September 28 – Barbara Krafft, Austrian portrait painter (born 1764)
November 17 – Daniel Berger, German engraver (born 1744)
December 29 – Jacques-Louis David, French painter (born 1748)
 date unknown – Pierre-Charles Jombert, French painter (born 1748)

References

 
Years of the 19th century in art
1820s in art